Grabonóg  is a village in the administrative district of Gmina Piaski, within Gostyń County, Greater Poland Voivodeship, in west-central Poland.

The village has a population of 535.

Notable residents
 Edmund Bojanowski, Polish layman beatified for sainthood by Pope John Paul II in 1999.

References

Villages in Gostyń County